Kauhakō Crater is a volcanic crater located in Kalawao County, Hawaii, United States. The crater was formed between 230,000 and 300,000 years ago, as the result of the eruption of volcano Pu'u' 'Uao. Lake Kauhakō, located at the bottom of the crater, has the world's greatest depth-to-surface area ratio of a lake and is the fourth deepest lake in the United States. In 2011, the lake underwent an overturning event, causing hydrogen sulfide to float to the surface of the lake and lifeforms, including shrimp and plankton, to disappear.

Formation 
Kauhakō Crater is thought to have formed around 230,000 to 300,000 years ago. Somewhere within this time period, Pu'u 'Uao, an undersea volcano located near what is now the peninsula, first erupted. After this, it continued to erupt several more times, spewing hot, fast lava. When this lava eventually cooled, the peninsula was formed, including Kauhakō Crater.

Geography and geology 

Kauhakō Crater is found in the center of the Kalaupapa Peninsula. A single terrace roughly 150 meters wide is located in the crater, above the lake. Much of the crater is forested, containing many  types of shrubs and trees, such as the wiliwili, a plant native to the area, but mostly non-native plants, including invasive  Schinus terebinthifolia (Brazilian peppertree) and Lantana camara (big-sage). A survey observed that black rats in the area were destroying certain native plants in the crater, particularly the endemic tree species Reynoldsia sandwicensis. 

The crater contains many lava channels and tubes, which vary significantly in size. In particular, a kilometer-long lava channel, which is up to 150 meters wide and 30 meters deep, begins at the crater's northeastern side and continues north. This channel contains many smaller channels and tubes that branch out of it.

Lake 
The crater contains a lake named Lake Kauhakō at the bottom. It is also the fourth-deepest lake in the United States. The shallower parts of the lake contain brackish water and are full of oxygen, which is where most of the plants and animals of the lake live, including plankton, shrimp, and copepods.

The lake's water quality is inspected by the National Park Service 4 times a year, which has occurred since 2009. In September 2011, the NPS saw that the surface of the lake was covered in a white layer, which revealed that hydrogen sulfide was floating to the surface of the lake and into the atmosphere. It is believed that this event occurred either due to a drought that caused the surface water, which contained a large amount of oxygen, to evaporate, or because of a landslide. After this overturning event, multiple aspects of the water quality changed significantly, most notably the oxygen level; In August, the percentage of dissolved oxygen (relative to saturation) was 227.37 (i.e. supersaturated); however, it dropped to 2.52 by November. This caused much of the life in the lake to die, including shrimp and phytoplankton.

Before this event, no instance of the lake being unusual was recorded from observation, nor has anything similar been recorded in historical times. After the event, the lake was observed consistently for a while. Observations on December 8 and December 12, 2011 showed that the layer was gone and the lake was a bluish green color, but there were still no shrimp. A few days later, on December 14, the lake was covered in a green layer of phytoplankton due to a heavy rain the last 48 hours. This caused shrimp and other forms of life to appear again, but by December 16, there was no life at the lake and it was colored bluish green again.

References 

Volcanoes of Hawaii
Geography of Kalawao County, Hawaii
Volcanic craters
Pleistocene volcanoes